Severo-Kurilsk (Kashiwabara) is a town and the administrative center of Severo-Kurilsky District of Sakhalin Oblast, Russia, located in the northern part of the Kuril Islands, on the island of Paramushir. Population:

History
The Ainu are the original inhabitants of Paramushir, which came under the control of the Russian Empire in the mid-18th century. Russian sovereignty was initially confirmed under the terms of the Treaty of Shimoda in 1855, but the island was transferred to the Empire of Japan per the Treaty of Saint Petersburg in 1875. The Japanese established a settlement, Kashiwabara, on the site of the largest Ainu village (Ottomai), which became the major port on the island, and a center for the commercial fishing industry, particularly for herring. The village was named for the captain of the survey vessel Iwaki, which charted the coasts of the island in 1875. The village had the northernmost post office in Japan. During World War II Kashiwabara was strongly garrisoned by the Imperial Japanese Army and served as the headquarters of the IJA 91st Infantry Division. Kashiwabara Airfield was established in the outskirts of the village, and numerous fortifications and gun emplacements were built. The area was subject to sporadic air raids from the US Army Air Force and US Navy based in the Aleutian Islands from 1943 until the end of the war.

During the Invasion of the Kuril Islands, Soviet forces landed on Paramushir on August 18, 1945, and combat operations continued through August 23, ending with the surrender of the surviving members of the Japanese garrison. The Soviets forcibly deported the remaining Japanese civilian inhabitants and sent the prisoners of war to labor camps. Kashiwabara was renamed Severo-Kurilsk (Northern Kuril Town) and the island annexed by the Soviet Union in 1946.

On November 5, 1952 the town was completely destroyed by the 1952 Severo-Kurilsk tsunami, with at least 2,336 of the town's 6,000 inhabitants killed. Severo-Kurilsk was rebuilt on higher ground, and the population soon rose above its original level, however in the years since the dissolution of the Soviet Union and the associated economic crisis of the 1990s, the town's population has again declined.

The surrounding area has some remaining Japanese fortifications visible. On 25 March 2020, an earthquake of magnitude 7.5 struck near the town of Severo-Kurilsk.

Gallery

Administrative and municipal status
Within the framework of administrative divisions, Severo-Kurilsk serves as the administrative center of Severo-Kurilsky District and is subordinated to it. As a municipal division, the town of Severo-Kurilsk and one rural locality of Severo-Kurilsky District are incorporated as Severo-Kurilsky Urban Okrug.

Economy
Commercial fishing is virtually the only industry in the town.

Climate
Severo-Kurilsk has a  subarctic climate (Köppen Dfc). The monthly average temperature is greater than 10 degrees Celsius only in August and September. Due to the influence of the cold current of the Oyashio current, it is cold and humid all year round. The annual precipitation is more than five times that of Siberia. Winter lasts from December through April, the months where temperatures average below freezing.

Sister city
 Nemuro, Hokkaido, Japan

References

Notes

Sources

Further reading
Krasheninnikov, Stepan Petrovich, and James Greive. The History of Kamtschatka and the Kurilski Islands, with the Countries Adjacent. Chicago: Quadrangle Books, 1963.
Rees, David. The Soviet Seizure of the Kuriles. New York: Praeger, 1985.

External links
Unofficial website of Severo-Kurilsk 

Cities and towns in Sakhalin Oblast
Paramushir